Baardwijk is a former village and municipality in the Dutch province of North Brabant, between Waalwijk and Drunen.

Until 1922, Baardwijk was a separate municipality; it is now a part of Waalwijk.

References

Former municipalities of North Brabant